The 2022 Spa-Francorchamps Formula 3 round was a motor racing event held on 27 and 28 August 2022 at the Circuit de Spa-Francorchamps, Stavelot, Belgium. It was the seventh round of the 2022 FIA Formula 3 Championship, and was held in support of the 2022 Belgian Grand Prix.

Classification

Qualifying
Caio Collet secured his maiden pole position in the rain-affected qualifying session, with Zane Maloney and, surprisingly, Francesco Pizzi in second and third respectively.

Sprint race 

Notes:
 – Jonny Edgar originally finished second, but was given a five-second time-penalty for causing a collison with Franco Colapinto.
 – Zak O'Sullivan originally finished twenteeth, but was given a five-second time-penalty for causing a collision with Juan Manuel Correa.
 – Enzo Trulli originally finished sixteenth, but was later disqualified due to unauthorised work that was carried out on his car during the red flag period, specifically alterations to the rear wing whilst the race was suspended, which is a breach of Article 42.4 of the FIA Sporting Regulations.
 – Ido Cohen was classified as he had completed more than 90% of the race distance

Feature race 

Notes:
 – Caio Collet originally finished third, but was given a five-second time-penalty for rejoining the track unsafely.
 – David Vidales originally finished seventh, but was later dropped one position for being found to have left the track and gained a lasting advantage whilst overtaking William Alatalo, allowing the latter to be promoted to seventh place.

Standings after the event 

Drivers' Championship standings

Teams' Championship standings

 Note: Only the top five positions are included for both sets of standings.

See also 
 2022 Belgian Grand Prix
 2022 Spa-Francorchamps Formula 2 round

Notes

References

External links 
 Official website

Spa-Francorchamps
2022 in Belgian motorsport